Amar Sylla (born 1 October 2001) is a Senegalese professional basketball player who plays for Real Betis of the Liga ACB. He also plays for the Senegalese national under-18 team.

Early life and career 
Sylla was born in Dakar, Senegal. Growing up, he preferred football but began playing basketball at the SEED Academy in Thiès because of his height. In 2015, after taking part in a basketball camp in Kébémer organized by NBA player Gorgui Dieng, Sylla moved to Spain to pursue the sport.

At Munich qualifiers for the 2019 Adidas Next Generation Tournament, Sylla averaged 14.5 points, 7.8 rebounds, and three blocks per game. He led the event in blocked shots and was named to the All-Tournament Team. In four games at the final tournament in Vitoria-Gasteiz, Spain, Sylla averaged 10.3 points, 8.5 rebounds, and 3.3 blocks per game. He helped the Real Madrid junior team win the championship.

Professional career
On 15 July 2019, Sylla signed with Filou Oostende of the Belgian Pro Basketball League (PBL) and European competition Basketball Champions League (BCL). He signed a three-year contract with an NBA opt-out clause. He played for the Orlando Magic in the 2021 NBA Summer League.

In August 2021, Sylla signed with Lithuanian club Nevėžis. He averaged 11.1 points and 7.7 rebounds over 30 games in the season. He played in the 2022 NBA Summer League with the Cleveland Cavaliers.

On 4 August 2022, he signed a one-year contract with Real Betis of the Spanish Liga ACB.

National team career 
Sylla played for the Senegalese national under-18 team at the 2018 FIBA Under-18 African Championship in Bamako, Mali, including in the qualifiers. In seven games, he averaged 13.4 points, 9.4 rebounds, and 2.3 assists per game, leading Senegal to second place.

In February 2022, Sylla was selected for the Senegal national team to play in the qualifiers of the 2023 FIBA Basketball World Cup.

References

External links 
Real Madrid profile

2001 births
Living people
Basketball players from Dakar
BC Nevėžis players
BC Oostende players
Real Betis Baloncesto players
Centers (basketball)
Liga ACB players
Power forwards (basketball)
Senegalese expatriate basketball people in Belgium
Senegalese expatriate basketball people in Spain
Senegalese men's basketball players